Groovie Goolies is an American animated television show that had its original run Saturday mornings on CBS between 1970 and 1972. It was rebroadcast the following season on Sunday mornings. Set at a decrepit castle, the show focused on its monstrous but good-natured and mostly friendly inhabitants. Created by Filmation, Groovie Goolies was an original creation of the studio; its characters would cross over with Filmation's Archie Comics adaptations including Sabrina the Teenage Witch and The Archie Show, as well as with the Looney Tunes cast.

Premise
The Goolies were a group of hip monsters residing at Horrible Hall (a haunted boarding house for monsters) on Horrible Drive. Many of the characters referred to each other as cousins. Most of the Goolies were (in look and sound) pop-culture echoes of the classic horror-film monsters created in the 1930s and 1940s, mostly by Universal Pictures. Shows consisted of fast-cut sequences of pun-filled jokes and short skits, and each episode included two pop songs, one performed by The Monster Trio (Drac, Frankie and Wolfie) and a closing number crooned by one of a rotating roster of guest bands.

Characters
 Drac – The short-tempered vampire who is the head of Horrible Hall. He plays the pipe organ in the Groovie Goolies that has arms where the music sheets would go. At the beginning of each episode where the viewer is welcomed to Horrible Hall, Drac in his bat form would try to fly into the window, only to crash into the wall when the window moves. Upon crash-landing, Drac would say "This place is driving me batty."
 Frankie – An easygoing Frankenstein's monster who headed the Muscle-leum Gymnasium. He plays the bone xylophone/drums in the Groovie Goolies. Often would be zapped by lightning, revealing his inner mechanical workings, and then remarking "I needed that!!" Frankie also had a dual identity as the inept superhero "Super Ghoul" (as seen in the song of the same name).
 Rover – Frankie's pet sauropod-type dinosaur.
 Wolfie – A hippie werewolf that speaks in a combination of beatnik, surfer, and hippie slang. Wolfie plays a lyre-like stringed instrument in the Groovie Goolies and is always seen wearing a T-shirt, shorts, and beach sandals. Wolfie is always out for a good time like running wild, surfing, or driving his Wolf Wagon. He especially gets on Drac's nerves.
 Fido – Wolfie's pet piranha that eats anything and can fly when necessary.
 Hagatha – A plump witch who served as the resident chef. She also has a living broom named Broomhilda and is the aunt of Hauntleroy.
 Bella La Ghostly – A female vampire who works as Horrible Hall's switchboard operator.
 Dr. Jekyll and Mr. Hyde – The two-headed resident doctor who often fought as to which one of them was Jekyll and/or Hyde. The right head is a normal "human" doctor while the left head is a green-skinned "monster" doctor. As a result, Dr. Jekyll and Mr. Hyde have their own second opinion.
 Mummy – A bandaged mummy who dabbles in first aid. Mummy serves as the newsman for "The Mummy's Wrap-Up" newscasts. He would often become unraveled.
 Boneapart – A skittish skeleton in a Napoleon hat who had a tendency to fall apart.
 Ghoulihand – A giant, talking, disembodied glove.
 Ratso and Batso – Two fanged imp-like brats with a penchant for coming up with plans for swiping treats, as well playing mean practical jokes that often backfired on them.
 Hauntleroy – A rotund, conniving, selfish and two-faced kid in a sailor suit who was often the primary foil for Ratso's and Batso's tricks. He is the nephew of Hagatha.
 Icky and Goo – Two gargoyle-like creatures that seem to be the main pets of Horrible Hall. Icky is a blue gargoyle-like creature, while Goo is a red gargoyle-like creature.
 Tiny Tomb– A diminutive, long-haired mummy with a high-pitched voice. He is the cousin of Mummy and the lead singer of the Mummies and the Puppies.
 Missy – An enigmatic mummified spook whose long, pink hair hides her face and body except for one large, blue eye. She is Tiny's wife and a member of the Mummies and the Puppies.
 Mama Casket – A plump green mummy who is a member of The Mummies and the Puppies.
 Orville – A large thing-eating plant.
 The Spookoo Clock - A cuckoo clock that has a vulture coming out of it.
 The Ask-It Casket - A talking casket that answers any questions given to it.
 The Lovesick Loveseat - A living loveseat that especially has a crush on Drac.
 The Skelevator - An elevator shaped like a large human skull.

Musical groups
Every episode featured two musical segments. The first one is by the Groovie Goolies with Drac on the pipe organ, Wolfie playing a lyre-like stringed instrument, and Frankie on a drum set with a xylophone made of bones. The second musical segment is by one of the other resident bands, including:

 The Bare Bones Band – A band consisting of three living skeletons.
 The Mummies and the Puppies – A folk/pop group led by Tiny Tomb on guitar, with his wife Missy on tambourine, Mama Casket on drums and four puppies (two sharing a guitar, one on tambourine and one on piano). 
 The Rolling Headstones – A band consisting of three living tombstones. Their names are Hudson Rock, Captain Marble and General Granite.
 The Spirits of '76 – A band consisting of three ghosts who all wear tri-cornered hats.

Cast
 John Erwin as Additional voices
 Dallas McKennon - Rover, Batso (episodes 13-16), Ratso (episodes 13-16), Goo, Salem, additional voices
 Larry D. Mann as Boneapart, additional voices
 Howard Morris as Frankie, Wolfie, Fido, Hagatha (episodes 14-16), Dr. Jekyll and Hyde, Mummy, Hauntleroy, Orville, additional voices
 Larry Storch as Drac, Hagatha, Ghoulihand, Batso, Ratso, Icky, additional voices
 Jane Webb as Bella La Ghostly, Sabrina Spellman, additional voices

Production
Thanks to television airings, the Universal Classic Monsters were having a resurgence of popularity in the 1960s and Filmation producer Lou Scheimer, who had grown up with the films, wanted to create a humorous animated adaptation. In 1968, Scheimer hired Laugh-In writers Jack Mendelsohn and Jim Mulligan to begin developing a show called Monster Inn, which would riff on the characters that Universal had popularized. Although some of their initial ideas fell by the wayside, the groundwork for Groovie Goolies was quickly laid, including having the monsters living together in a castle and the lead trio performing pop songs. Mendelsohn also had been raised with the Universal films, and claimed to have done most of the work on the show, while Mulligan "took the money and ran."

In 1969, Fred Silverman, the Head of Children's Programming at CBS asked for a companion to Filmation's popular The Archie Show, so the company began developing a series for fellow Archie Comics character Sabrina the Teenage Witch, who had already appeared as a supporting character on the show. Silverman was also looking to exploit the overwhelming success of the network's new cartoon Scooby-Doo, Where Are You!, so he optioned Scheimer's monster show, which went through a succession of titles before they settled on Groovie Goolies.  Since both shows featured witches, the decision was made to package them together in an hour-long block. Interestingly, monsters had been common to the Archie's Mad House comics, Sabrina's actual origins.

Sabrina and the Groovie Goolies premiered in 1970, featuring two 15-minute segments of Sabrina, and a 30-minute block of Groovie Goolies, with the characters crossing over into both shows. During the inaugural season, it was the highest-rated children's program, receiving a 54% audience share. This incarnation featured a variation of the Goolie Get-Together theme song which announced, "It's time for the Goolies and Sabrina!"

In 1971, CBS split the two shows apart and paired reruns of Groovie Goolies with Tom and Jerry on Sunday mornings in an hour-long animation block, beginning on September 12, 1971. It was at this point that the more common Goolie Get-Together opening credits sequence was created, consisting of a montage of scenes from the song The Monster Trio. After a single season on Sundays, the show was canceled.

Despite the cancellation, CBS was not done with the Groovie Goolies yet. In 1972, they were bumped up to regulars on Sabrina the Teenage Witch, appearing in half of that season's episodes, which continued to be rerun until 1974. That same year, they also appeared on rival network ABC in a film entitled Daffy Duck and Porky Pig Meet the Groovie Goolies (which was part of The ABC Saturday Superstar Movie), teaming them with the Looney Tunes characters. This movie also featured a brief, live-action sequence featuring some of the Goolies, including Frankie, Drac, Wolfie and Hauntleroy. ABC later rebroadcast the original series for one season in 1975, both on Saturday and Sunday mornings. The characters made their final original appearances in two episodes of NBC's 1977 series The New Archie and Sabrina Hour, and Frankie was featured in that show's closing credits.

In 1977, the show entered syndication as part of an anthology series entitled The Groovie Goolies and Friends, which featured over 104 half-hour episodes. The Groovie Goolies were packaged with several other Filmation series in shared rotation. The syndication format featured new opening credits and "bumpers" featuring the Goolies interacting with characters from the various shows, while the original end credits for each series was retained. The syndication package included The New Adventures of Waldo Kitty (minus the live-action sequences) (13 shows), Lassie's Rescue Rangers (17 shows), The New Adventures of Gilligan (24 shows), My Favorite Martians (16 shows), and former Uncle Croc's Block segments M.U.S.H. ("Mangy Unwanted Shabby Heroes"), Fraidy Cat, and Wacky and Packy (combined into 18 shows).

In 1978, Filmation planned to produce a Groovie Goolies feature film, but it never came to fruition. In 1984, the company decided to resurrect the property, developing two separate shows. "Fright Camp" was set at a summer camp and would have starred the Junior Goolies, the children of the pre-established Groovie Goolies. A second prospective show was titled The Goolies and would have featured the characters as toddlers. Neither series ever got past the development stage. For their 1986 Ghostbusters cartoon, Filmation borrowed many elements from the show, most notably the Skelevator, and they reused designs and animation of Drac and Bella La Ghostly in the episode "The Girl Who Cried Vampire".

The cartoon aired with the UK version of Hanna-Barbera's Banana Splits in the early 1980s. The show was translated into many languages and was broadcast globally, garnering numerous video releases in Germany and various other countries, spawning tie-in albums in different languages, and the show was so popular in France that the characters were featured on a float in France's 1986 Carnaval de Cholet. The complete series was remastered and issued on DVD in the US in 2006. Since then, various episodes have surfaced on compilation DVDs, and discs have also been issued elsewhere around the globe. In May 2009, re-edited minisodes were released on the streaming site Crackle.

Show structure
The show was structured very much like the then-popular show Rowan & Martin's Laugh-In, with several short segments of one-liner jokes and riddles. This was most shown by "Weird Windows Time", a take-off on Laugh-Ins famous Joke Wall. Every so often, one of the Goolies had a special segment in which they instructed the audience about one thing or another, such as:

 Dracula's Schoolhouse – A school that provides the finer points of (mad) science.
 Hagatha's Bedtime Stories – Hagatha reads a popular fairy tale to Frankie at bedtime, with the other inhabitants in different parts.
 Home Movies – The inhabitants watch the home movies of their past activities.
 The Mummy's Wrap-Up – A news program hosted by Mummy, who reports news revolving around monsters.
 Wolfie's Theater – Wolfie re-enacts a popular fairy tale with some of the inhabitants, while the others watch.

Groovie Goolies episodes
The scripts for the shows are untitled; they are differentiated only by episode number. When the series was issued on DVD, episodes were saddled with the title of one of the two featured songs.

Special
Daffy Duck and Porky Pig Meet the Groovie Goolies is a one-off special that aired on The ABC Saturday Superstar Movie.

Sabrina the Teenage Witch
Following the cancellation of the show, the Goolies went on to be prominently featured in eight episodes (16 shorts) during the 1972-73 season of Sabrina the Teenage Witch.

The New Archie and Sabrina Hour
The Groovie Goolies made two final appearances in segments of The New Archie and Sabrina Hour.

Musical releases
American version
In late 1970 RCA Victor Records released the album Groovie Goolies (RCA LSP 4420). The cover is adorned with two photos of the album's producers/musicians as the live-action Wolfie (Jeffrey Thomas), Frankie (Ed Fournier), and Drac (Dick Monda), as well as a small image of the animated monster trio.

All of the songs on the disc were written by Linda Martin and Sherry Gayden. "We Go So Good Together" and "Spend Some Time Together" are both original compositions that were never featured on the show. The only singles issued from the album were "First Annual Semi-Formal Combination Celebration Meet-the-Monster Population Party" and "Save Your Good Lovin' For Me."

Monda reworked the lyrics of, and re-recorded, an additional song from the series, "Chick-A-Boom (Don't Ya Jes' Love It)", under the pseudonym Daddy Dewdrop in 1971. The tune was included on Dewdrop's self-titled album and a single was released which peaked at #5 on the Cash Box Top 100 singles chart, which landed him on a list of One Hit Wonders at The Rock and Roll Hall of Fame.

French version
In 1983, a tie-in album was issued in France by Magical Ring Records under the show's French title Les Croque Monstres. The only English-language song that was translated into French was the theme song, and a band performed the song to promote the album dressed as the show's characters. The record includes a strange assortment of monster-themed tunes and covers of hits by artists such as Taxxi ("Not Me Girl"), Sylvester ("Do Ya Wanna Funk"), and The Doobie Brothers ("Long Train Runnin'"). The album was reissued on CD in 2013 by Balthazar Music with a slightly different track order.

Czechoslovakian version
In 1992, Bonton Records issued a pair of albums titled Bubušou 1 and 2'''. Combined, the two albums include renditions of all 33 of the songs featured on the show, with Czech lyrics adapted by Jiří Josek.

Bubušou 1

Bubušou 2

Home video
All of the Groovie Goolies' appearances have been issued on video in various regions around the world, with the exceptions of the live-action sequence in Daffy Duck and Porky Pig Meet the Groovie Goolies and the syndicated Groovie Goolies and Friends'' show.

VHS

DVD

References

External links
The Final Taxi Podcast on Archie Comics' publisher Richard Goldwater
 
 Episode guide at the Big Cartoon DataBase

1970s American animated television series
1970s American horror comedy television series
1970s American musical comedy television series
1970 American television series debuts
1971 American television series endings
American children's animated comedy television series
American children's animated horror television series
American children's animated musical television series
American animated television spin-offs
Animated musical groups
CBS original programming
English-language television shows
Television series by Filmation
Television series by Universal Television
Vampires in animated television
Television series about werewolves
Works based on Frankenstein
Works set in castles
RCA Records artists
Television shows directed by Hal Sutherland